Helical extrusion technology is applied in the plastic pipe industry. Basically the production process is a direct extrusion. During the pipe production several different materials - depending on the desired final pipe - are mixed in the extrusion unit according to a special formula depending. The production machine is fed with granule material (PE or PP for structured wall gravity pipes and PE, glass fiber and bonding agent for pressure pipes). During the complex extrusion and mixing process a homogeneous profile is helically extruded on a preheated rotating mandrel. In the case that a gravity pipe is being produced the profile is a structured wall and in the case of pressure pipe the profile is a solid wall. The production is a discontinuous procedure.

References

Forming processes